The Beyond / Where the Giants Roam is an EP by American musician Thundercat. It was released on June 22, 2015 via Brainfeeder.

Background
In an interview with Billboard, Thundercat stated that the EP had been conceived while making Flying Lotus' You're Dead!, Kamasi Washington's The Epic, and Kendrick Lamar's To Pimp a Butterfly, stating that the four had shared creative ideas for each of their projects. The EP was revealed to be a prelude to Bruner's followup album, Drunk.

Critical reception
At Metacritic, which assigns a weighted average score out of 100 to reviews from mainstream critics, the EP received an average score of 81% based on 9 reviews, indicating "universal acclaim".

It ranked at number 24 on Pitchforks "50 Best Albums of 2015" list.

Track listing

Personnel
 Thundercat – vocals, bass, production
 Charles Dickerson (Mono/Poly) – production, keyboards, programming
 Steven Ellison (Flying Lotus) – production, keyboards, programming
 Miguel Atwood-Ferguson – strings on 2 and 4
 Dennis Hamm – keyboards on 3 and 6
 Kamasi Washington – saxophone on 3
 Herbie Hancock – keyboards on 4
 Taylor Graves – drum programing on 6
 Daddy Kev – mastering

Charts

Notes

References

External links
 

2015 EPs
Albums produced by Flying Lotus
Albums produced by Thundercat (musician)
Brainfeeder albums
Thundercat (musician) albums